Milica Đurđević Stamenkovski (born 21 July 1990) is a Serbian politician and political scientist. She co-founded the far-right Serbian Party Oathkeepers in 2012 and is currently serving as its spokesperson.

Early life and education 
She was born 21 July 1990 in Belgrade. She graduated from the University of Belgrade Faculty of Political Sciences.

Political career 
She distinguished herself as the leader of ultranationalist protests with the support of other right-wing organizations against the 2008 Kosovo declaration of independence, the arrest of Radovan Karadžić, Ratko Mladić, the ICTY verdicts and the implementation of agreements on border crossings between Serbia and Kosovo, and the Brussels Agreement. Protests were also organized against the arrival of former British Prime Minister Tony Blair and the ratification of the Agreement between Serbia and NATO on the cooperation in the field of logistical support.

She participated at the rally in support of Syrian President Bashar al-Assad and at the rally in support of the Russian Federation on the occasion of the annexation of Crimea and the War in Donbas. She was the leader of the list of the Serbian Party Oathkeepers for the 2014 Serbian parliamentary elections in a coalition with Borislav Pelevic, however the list did not pass the 5% threshold. On 10 September 2017, she married Stefan Stamenkovski, president and founder of the Serbian Party Oathkeepers.

References

External links 
 zavetnici.rs

Living people
1990 births
University of Belgrade alumni
Serbian politicians
21st-century Serbian women politicians
21st-century Serbian politicians
Serbian nationalists
Candidates for President of Serbia
Serbian Party Oathkeepers politicians
Serbian Radical Party politicians
Members of the National Assembly (Serbia)
Women members of the National Assembly (Serbia)